Hans Jakob Hitz (born 12 April 1949 in Zons) is a West German retired slalom canoeist who competed in the 1970s. He won a silver medal in the C-2 team event at the 1971 ICF Canoe Slalom World Championships in Meran. Hitz also finished ninth in the C-2 event at the 1972 Summer Olympics in Munich.

References
Sports-reference.com profile

1949 births
Canoeists at the 1972 Summer Olympics
German male canoeists
Living people
Olympic canoeists of West Germany
Medalists at the ICF Canoe Slalom World Championships